Zhang Hao (born July 6, 1984) is a Chinese retired pair skater. With current partner Yu Xiaoyu, he is the 2016–17 Grand Prix Final silver medalist, 2017 Asian Winter Games champion and 2018 Chinese national champion. With former partner Peng Cheng, he is the 2015 Four Continents silver medalist. With former partner Zhang Dan, he is the 2006 Olympic silver medalist, a  four-time (2005 bronze, 2006, 2008, 2009 silver) World medalist, and a two-time (2005, 2010) Four Continents champion.

Personal life 
Zhang married his girlfriend, Ju Chi, in May 2014. On May 8, 2015, the couple welcomed their first child, a son.

Career 
Early in his career, Zhang Hao competed with Zhang Liyun.

Partnership with Zhang Dan 
Zhang teamed up with Zhang Dan, to whom he is not related, in 1997. In 1998–99 Junior Grand Prix (JGP), the pair competed in one event and won the gold medal. They continued the season with a bronze medal at the 1999 Chinese National Championships. The following season, they competed in two 1999–2000 JGP events, medaling in both. They qualified for the final, where they finished fifth. That year, they were second at nationals and finished fourth at Junior Worlds.

The following three seasons, they were very successful at the junior level. They won all their Junior Grand Prix events, including the 2000–01 JGP Final and the 2001–02 JGP Final. They also competed in the 2001 Junior Worlds and the 2003 Junior Worlds, winning gold both times. At the Chinese National Championships, they placed third in both 2001 and 2002, before winning their first national title in 2003.

Their first senior international was the 2002 Four Continents Championships, where they won the bronze medal. The same season they competed in the 2002 Olympics, placing 11th, and the 2002 Worlds, placing 9th. The following season they competed in their first two senior Grand Prix events, placing fourth at both events. They repeated with a bronze medal at the 2003 Four Continents Championships and improved their placement at the 2003 Worlds, finishing sixth. In the 2003–04 and 2004–05 seasons, they consistently medaled at their Grand Prix events. They won gold at the 2005 Four Continents Championships and bronze at the 2005 Worlds.

Zhang and Zhang went into the 2006 Olympics as medal contenders. During their free skate, Zhang Dan had a bad fall on their attempted throw quadruple salchow, a jump that was not consistent. Zhang Dan suffered a bad injury, but chose to finish the program. Although the delay between the fall and the continuation of the program was longer than the ISU-proscribed 2 minutes, they were not automatically withdrawn because the referee waited before stopping the music and beginning the official 2 minute wait. Zhang regrouped and was able to finish the program. They won the silver medal, placing ahead of defending Olympic medalists Shen Xue and Hongbo Zhao. At Worlds they won the silver, behind Pang Qing and Tong Jian.

In the 2006–07 season, Zhang and Zhang placed first at Skate Canada, second at the NHK Trophy, and would go on to win the bronze medal at the Grand Prix Final. They placed 5th at the 2007 World Championships later that season. In the 2007–08 and the 2008–09 seasons, they won silver medals at both the Grand Prix Final and the World Championships. At the 2010 Winter Olympics, the Zhangs placed 5th. They also finished fifth at 2010 World Championships.

Before the 2010–11 season began, Zhang Hao broke his finger, forcing the team to pull out of their two Grand Prix assignments. He also dealt with some shoulder and cervical vertebra problems. The Zhangs returned to competition during the 2011–12 season, winning silver medals at the 2011 Skate America and the 2011 Cup of China. They finished 4th at the 2011–12 Grand Prix Final. Zhang Dan eventually became the tallest competing female pair skater. Her height proved to be a challenge for the pair, and in May 2012, it was announced that their partnership had ended and she was retiring from competition.

Partnership with Peng Cheng 
In May 2012, Zhang Hao confirmed he had formed a new partnership with Peng Cheng. The pair made their international debut at the 2012 Cup of China. They placed 11th at their first World Championships.

In the 2013–14 season, Peng/Zhang won their first Grand Prix medals, bronze at the 2013 Cup of China and silver at the 2013 NHK Trophy, and qualified for the Grand Prix Final, where they came in fourth. They were selected for the 2014 Winter Olympics and finished eighth in Sochi. Ending their season, they placed fifth at the 2014 World Championships in Saitama.

For the 2014–15 Grand Prix season, Peng/Zhang were assigned to Skate America and Cup of China, where they placed 3rd and 1st, respectively, qualifying for the 2015 Grand Prix Final. They finished 4th at that competition after placing 5th in the short program and 3rd in the free skate. They won the silver medal at the 2015 Four Continents Figure Skating Championships. At the 2015 World Figure Skating Championships, they earned personal best scores in the free skate and combined total to finish in 4th place overall.

Partnership with Yu Xiaoyu 
On April 14, 2016, International Figure Skating magazine broke the news of Zhang's new partnership with Yu Xiaoyu. The Chinese Skating Association decided to switch partners between the two pairs of Peng/Zhang and Yu/Jin. They took the silver medal at the 2016 Skate Canada and won gold at the 2016 Cup of China. At the 2016–17 Grand Prix Final in Marseille they won the silver medal behind Evgenia Tarasova / Vladimir Morozov.

Yu/Zhang began their season at the 2017 Cup of Nice where they placed first. In their first Grand Prix event of the season, Yu/Zhang placed second at the 2017 Cup of China after ranking second in both the short program and free skate. In their second Grand Prix event at 2017 Skate America, Yu/Zhang again placed second after ranking second in both programs. Their scores in both Grand Prix events have qualified Yu/Zhang for the 2017-18 Grand Prix Final, where they placed sixth. They won the Chinese National Championship and were named to the Chinese Olympic and World teams. They placed eighth at the Olympics, and seventh at Worlds.

Due to injury, they withdrew from both of their 2018-19 Grand Prix events and did not compete at Nationals. They did not compete again until the 2019-20 Nationals, where they placed fourth.

In September of 2020, it was reported that Yu and Zhang had split.

Age controversy 

On February 14, 2011, the Zhangs' ages became the subject of controversy. Although his International Skating Union bio lists Zhang Hao as born on July 6, 1984, a Chinese skating association website suggested he was born on February 6, 1982. This would mean he was too old to compete in junior events during the 2002–03 season, such as the 2003 World Junior Championships where they won gold. His partner's age also came under scrutiny. Her ISU bio states that she was born on October 4, 1985 but the Chinese website suggested she was born on that day in 1987, meaning she was 14 and too young to compete in senior events during the 2001–02 season, such as the Four Continents where they won bronze, as well as the Olympics and World Championships. The dates disappeared from the website by February 15. On February 17, the ISU said there were no discrepancies for the Zhangs in terms of the birthdates listed on their passports, ISU registration forms and the Chinese Olympic Committee's website.

Programs

With Yu Xiaoyu

With Peng Cheng

With Zhang Dan

Competitive highlights 
GP: Grand Prix; JGP: Junior Grand Prix

With Yu Xiaoyu

With Peng Cheng

With Zhang Dan

Detailed results

With Peng Cheng

References

External links 

 
 
 
  

1984 births
Living people
Chinese male pair skaters
Figure skaters at the 2002 Winter Olympics
Figure skaters at the 2006 Winter Olympics
Figure skaters at the 2010 Winter Olympics
Figure skaters at the 2014 Winter Olympics
Figure skaters at the 2018 Winter Olympics
Figure skaters at the 2007 Winter Universiade
Medalists at the 2007 Winter Universiade
Olympic figure skaters of China
Olympic silver medalists for China
Figure skaters from Harbin
Olympic medalists in figure skating
World Figure Skating Championships medalists
Four Continents Figure Skating Championships medalists
World Junior Figure Skating Championships medalists
Medalists at the 2006 Winter Olympics
Figure skaters at the 2017 Asian Winter Games
Medalists at the 2017 Asian Winter Games
Asian Games gold medalists for China
Universiade medalists in figure skating
Asian Games medalists in figure skating
Season-end world number one figure skaters
Universiade gold medalists for China